Neil Boonzaaier (born 30 April 1956) is a South African cricketer. He played in twenty-two first-class and eight List A matches from 1983/84 to 1990/91.

References

External links
 

1956 births
Living people
South African cricketers
Border cricketers
Gauteng cricketers
Cricketers from Cape Town